Shakespeare in the Arb is an annual event, presented in the open, in Nichols Arboretum. Nichols Arboretum is a 123-acre (49.7 hectares) heavily wooded park, with large landscape lawns surrounded by the woods, a river, and steep hills. The plays are moving events, with both performers and audience moving from location to location within the park as the play progresses. At each location a segment of the play is performed. The plays begin in the early evening, and are put on near the summer solstice as no artificial lighting is used.

The park is near to the University of Michigan, and downtown Ann Arbor Michigan.

History 
Shakespeare in the Arb was founded in 2001 by Inger Schultz, and Kate Mendeloff. Mendeloff has been the artistic director since its inception.

Performances

Each year one play is presented. Most years, three weeks (Thurs-Sun) of performances are given. They all begin fours hours before sunset, at 6:30 p.m. local time (EDT). Each performance takes about 2.5 hours. The production travels from spot to spot within the arboretum to create the different scenes. "As one critic commented, 'The actors used the vastness of its Arb[oretum] stage to full advantage, making entrances from behind trees, appearing over rises and vanishing into the woods.'"

The arboretum is a public park, situated in the center of an urban area, next to a railroad track, and a large medical center. Thus performances can be interrupted by trains, medevac helicopters, and other park visitors. The weather is a factor, with large rainstorms always possible.

Reception
Since the beginning of its second season, Shakespeare in the Arb, has sold out nearly every performance. Tickets are sold on the day of the performances, and are first-come, first-served. The line for tickets begins forming two hours before the box office opens, as "Shakespeare in the Arb is a hugely popular local summer tradition."

A Midsummer Night's Dream
A particular favorite is A Midsummer Night's Dream. The play—with its natural setting, structure, and language—is perfect for presenting in the arboretum, which features dense heavy woods with mature trees, large lawns, steep hills, and a river. In 2015, A Midsummer Night's Dream was presented for the third time since the festival began.

References

External links 
  (doesn't seem to work, 6/18/2016)
  Facebook page

Shakespeare festivals in the United States
Culture of Ann Arbor, Michigan
University of Michigan